Denis Kudla and Danny Thomas were the defending champions but chose not to defend their title.

Harri Heliövaara and Henri Laaksonen won the title after defeating Toshihide Matsui and Frederik Nielsen 6–3, 6–4 in the final.

Seeds

Draw

References
 Main Draw
 Qualifying Draw

Charlottesville Men's Pro Challenger - Doubles
2018 Doubles